Catherine the Great, also known as Catherine II, was the Empress of Russia from 1762 to 1796.

Catherine the Great may also refer to:

People 
Catherine Ndereba (born 1972), a Kenyan long-distance runner

Arts, entertainment, and media

Artworks
Catherine the Great (Fabergé egg), also called "Catherine the Great Egg", "Grisaille Egg", and "Pink Cameo Egg", an Imperial Fabergé egg made under the supervision of Peter Carl Fabergé for the Russian Imperial family

Films
Catherine the Great (1920 film), and German silent historical film directed by Reinhold Schünzel 
Catherine the Great (1934 film), also titled The Rise of Catherine the Great, a British historical film based on the play The Czarina by Lajos Bíróand Melchior Lengyel
Catherine the Great (TV movie), a 1995 television movie starring Catherine Zeta-Jones

Literature
Catherine the Great: Portrait of a Woman, a 2011 biography by Robert Massie
Katharine the Great, a 1979 biography of the Washington Post publisher Katharine Graham

Music 
"Catherine the Great", a song by The Divine Comedy from their album Foreverland
Ekatarina Velika, a Serbian band

Television
Catherine the Great (miniseries), a 2019 British-American television miniseries starring Helen Mirren
Catherine the Great (TV series), a 2015 Russian television series starring Yuliya Snigir
 The Great (TV series), a 2020 American television series starring Elle Fanning